Huixing may refer to:

 Huixing (educator) (1871–1905), Qing dynasty educator who founded a women's school
 Huixing Station, Chongqing, China
 Huixing Subdistrict, Henan, China